Doyle Piwniuk is a Canadian politician, who was elected to the Manitoba Legislative Assembly in a by-election on January 28, 2014. He represents the electoral district of Turtle Mountain as a member of the Progressive Conservative Party of Manitoba (PCs).

Prior to his election to the legislature, Piwniuk was an insurance broker and financial planner in Virden. He began his political service in opposition, and served in the party's shadow cabinet as critic for multiculturalism and literacy. He was re-elected in provincewide general elections in 2016 and 2019, in which the PCs won government.

Electoral record

 
|Progressive Conservative
| Doyle Piwniuk
|align="right"| 3,137
|align="right"| 68.20
|align="right"| +2.23
|align="right"|15,355.65

|- bgcolor="white"
!align="right" colspan=3|Total valid votes
!align="right"|4,600
!align="right"|100.00
!align="right"|
|align="right"|
|- bgcolor="white"
!align="right" colspan=3|Rejected and declined votes
!align="right"|10
!align="right"|
!align="right"|
|align="right"|
|- bgcolor="white"
!align="right" colspan=3|Turnout
!align="right"|4,610
!align="right"|33.55
!align="right"|
|align="right"|
|- bgcolor="white"
!align="right" colspan=3|Electors on the lists
!align="right"|13,739
!align="right"|
!align="right"|
|align="right"|

|}

References

Living people
Progressive Conservative Party of Manitoba MLAs
People from Virden, Manitoba
21st-century Canadian politicians
Year of birth missing (living people)